A redcap is a goblin in Northumbrian folklore.

Redcap or red cap may also refer to:

Geography
 Red Cap, California, a former mining camp in Klamath County, California

Mission
 Redcap, a real rescue mission assigned to the Civil Air Patrol, as contrasted with a SARCAP, a practice mission.

Birds
 Derbyshire Redcap, a chicken breed usually known as the Redcap
 European goldfinch, a small passerine bird in the finch family

Uniforms with red caps
 Nickname for a Royal Military Police officer in the British Army
 Porter (railroad) at a railway station (Canadian or American English)
 Skycap, a porter at an airport 
 Jacksonville Red Caps, a Negro league baseball team
 Bonnets Rouges, 21st century French protest movement
 Nickname for the Chapelgorris, a type of volunteer unit during the Spanish First Carlist War
 Nickname for the Requetés, a type of volunteer unit during the Spanish Civil War

Brands and products
 Red Cap Ale, a brand of the Brick Brewing Company
 REDCAP, a mission designation of the Civil Air Patrol
 REDCap (Research Electronic Data Capture)
 RED CAP, AirAsia airline call sign
 Red Kap is an American workwear company.

Books
 Little Red Cap is an alternate title for the fairy tale Little Red Riding Hood.
 Little Red Cap (poem), is an adaptation by Carol Ann Duffy.
 Red Cap (book), a 1991 historical fiction book by G. Clifton Wisler
 Redcap (novel), a 2006 novel by the author Brian Callison

Film and TV
 Redcap (TV series), a 1964 British television series, starring John Thaw
 Red Cap (TV series), a 2001 British television series, starring Tamzin Outhwaite
 Red Caps (TV series), a 2011 Italian-Finnish television series

Other
 "Redcap", slang appellation for supporters of the Make America Great Again movement, as red caps with this slogan are frequently worn
 REDCap (Research Electronic Data Capture), a software solution and workflow methodology
 Red Cap Garage, a former gay bar in Portland, Oregon
 Redcap, cultural reference, from the song by Blue Oyster Cult 'Before The Kiss, A Redcap'  The term "redcap" was supposedly slang for a type of barbiturate; however, "redcap" usually referred to the drug Dalmane.

See also
 Red beret

Animal common name disambiguation pages